= Al Habtoor Women's 25K =

- 2021 Al Habtoor Women's 25K

ITF Women's Tour
- Event name: Al Habtoor Women's 25K
- Location: Dubai, United Arab Emirates
- Venue: Habtoor Grand Beach Resort & Spa
- Category: ITF Women's Circuit
- Surface: Hard
- Draw: 32S/32Q/16D
- Prize money: $25,000+H
- Website: Official website

The Al Habtoor Women's 25K is a tournament for professional female tennis players, played on outdoor hard courts. The event is classified as a $25,000+H ITF Women's Circuit tournament and its first event will be held in Dubai, United Arab Emirates between 29 March 2021 and 4 April 2021.

== Player ==
Eighty plus players from around the world with International WTA ranking will participate in first edition of tournament.
